Monteagudo is the name of:

 Monteagudo, Bolivia, a town in Bolivia
 Monteagudo, Navarre, a town and municipality located in the province of Navarre, Spain
 Monteagudo del Castillo, a town and municipality in the province of Teruel, Spain
 Monteagudo de las Salinas, a town and municipality in the province of Cuenca, Spain
 Monteagudo de las Vicarías a town and municipality in the province of Soria, Spain
 Chilean frigate Monteagudo, a Spanish prize captured by the Chilean Navy in 1824
 Gabino Cué Monteagudo (born 1966), Mexican politician